Condor is an American thriller television series based on the novel Six Days of the Condor by James Grady and its 1975 film adaptation Three Days of the Condor written by Lorenzo Semple Jr. and David Rayfiel. The series stars Max Irons. The series was created by Todd Katzberg, Jason Smilovic, and Ken Robinson and premiered on June 6, 2018 on Audience. In July 2018, the series had been renewed for a second season, although in January 2020, Audience announced it would be ending operations in its current format. The second season, already filmed at the time of the announcement, premiered on June 9, 2020, on C More and RTÉ2.
In December 2020, its existing two seasons were picked up by Epix. They began premiering the second season on November 7, 2021.

Premise 
Joe Turner is an idealistic millennial who joins the CIA and hopes to reform it from within. He stumbles onto a secret plan that threatens the lives of millions. When professional killers massacre everyone in his office, Joe is forced into a battle with the most dangerous elements of the military-industrial complex.

Cast and characters

Main 
 Max Irons as Joe Turner, a CIA analyst whose fellow agents in the research and development office are all killed. Marko Vujicic portrays a young Joe Turner in a recurring role.
 William Hurt as Bob Partridge (season 1, guest season 2), Joe's paternal uncle by marriage and the man who recruited him into joining the CIA.
 Leem Lubany as Gabrielle Joubert (season 1, guest season 2), a former Mossad assassin working for the CIA  operating as a freelancer.
 Angel Bonanni as Deacon Mailer (season 1), an assassin.
 Kristen Hager as Mae Barber, the wife of Joe's CIA colleague Sam.
 Mira Sorvino as Marty Frost (season 1), Bob's former lover who leads the official investigation into Joe's alleged crime.
 Bob Balaban as Reuel Abbott, the Deputy Director of the CIA.
 Toby Leonard Moore as Gordon Piper (season 2)
 Constance Zimmer as Robin Larkin (season 2)
 Alexei Bondar as Vasili Sirin (season 2)
 Isidora Goreshter as Kat Gnezdy (season 2)
 Jonathan Kells Phillips as Akardyr Volk (season 2)
 Eric Johnson as Tracy Crane (season 2)

Recurring 

 Katherine Cunningham as Kathy Hale (season 1)
 Brendan Fraser as Nathan Fowler (season 1)
 Gage Graham-Arbuthnot as Jude Barber
 Sam McCarthy as Sam Barber Jr.
 Kristoffer Polaha as Sam Barber (season 1)
 Steve Belford as Manfredi (season 1)
 Jamie Robinson as The Watcher (season 1)
 Christina Moses as Sharla Shepard (season 1)
 Gabriel Hogan as Boyd Ferris (season 1)
 Ellen Wong as Sarah Tan (season 1)
 Michelle Vergara Moore as Carla Tizon (season 2)
 Kate Vernon as Lily Partridge
 Samer Salem as Ammar Nazari (season 1)
 Mouna Traoré as Iris Loramer (season 1)
 Delmar Abuzeid as Caleb Wolfe (season 1)
 Melissa O'Neil as Janice (season 1)
 Kjartan Hewitt as Harold Floss (season 1)
 Jess Salgueiro as Jada
 Tennille Read as Ellie
 Jamie McShane as Gareth Lloyd
 John Bourgeois as Nathan's Father (season 1)
 Taylor Thorne as Chloe Fowler
 Jean-Michel Le Gal as Elden Loramer (season 1)
 Ahmed Muslimani as Saeed Abu-Saeed
 Rita Volk as Polina (season 2)

Guest 

 Julian Black Antelope as Mika ("What Loneliness")
 James McDougall as Tim Edward Mburu ("What Loneliness")
 Roger Dunn as Dr. Lappe ("What Loneliness")
 Kevin Claydon as Patrick ("The Solution to All Problems")
 Jennifer Foster as Sophia Folwer ("A Good Patriot")
 Raven Dauda as Hoyle ("A Good Patriot")
 Allison Hossack as Melanie Abbot ("No Such Thing")

Episodes 
Each episode's title is borrowed from a quote, which is displayed along its author.

Season 1 (2018)

Season 2 (2020)

Production

Development 

On May 13, 2016, it was announced that DirecTV had given the production a series order. Production companies involved with the series were reported to include Skydance Television and MGM Television. On February 6, 2017, it was announced that Jason Smilovic and Todd Katzberg would write the series. Smilovic would also act as showrunner and executive produce alongside Katzberg, David Ellison, Dana Goldberg, and Marcy Ross. On March 27, 2017, Andrew McCarthy mentioned in an interview with Parade that he would serve as an executive producer for the series and direct a few episodes. On April 6, 2017, it was announced that Lawrence Trilling would direct the series' first three episodes and act as an executive producer.

On July 27, 2018, it was announced during the annual Television Critics Association's summer press tour that the series had been renewed for a second season. In February 2022, Epix renewed the show again for a third season.

Casting 
On February 6, 2017, it was announced that Max Irons had been cast in the series' lead role. In April 2017, it was reported that Brendan Fraser, William Hurt, Bob Balaban, Leem Lubany, Kristen Hager, and Angel Bonanni had joined the main cast and that Mira Sorvino, Christina Moses, Katherine Cunningham, Gabriel Hogan, Kristoffer Polaha, and Kate Vernon had been cast in recurring roles. On August 25, 2017, it was announced that Mouna Traoré and Ellen Wong had joined the cast in a recurring capacity.

Filming 
Principal photography for the series was expected to last from April 23 to August 15, 2017 in Toronto, Ontario, Canada. Filming primarily took place at Cinespace Film Studios' Kipling Avenue facility. On May 30, 2017, Jack Lakey, a Toronto Star columnist, contacted the city's film liaison office, after Condor crew members allegedly bullied local residents. In Lakey's follow-up article the next day he quoted film industry workers, who supported those working on the production. Filming for the second season began on April 29, 2019 and ended on August 29, 2019.

Release

Marketing 
On February 22, 2018, Audience released a behind-the-scenes video for the series.

Premiere 
On March 10, 2018, the series held its official premiere in Austin, Texas at the annual South by Southwest Film Festival. Audience also hosted an interactive experience called "Condor Headquarters" during the festival. Guests to the exhibit were offered the chance to participate in authentic CIA activities such as skill tests, physical and digital technology tactics, lie detection, and environmental analysis. The experience also allowed guests to win prizes and screen exclusive content from the series.

In June 2018, the series was screened at the annual ATX TV Festival in Austin, Texas. A question-and-answer session followed the screening featuring director/executive producer Lawrence Trilling and cast members Leem Lubany, Katherine Cunningham, Kristen Hager, and Kristoffer Polaha.

Reception 
On the review aggregation website Rotten Tomatoes, the series holds an 86% approval rating with an average rating of 6.67 out of 10 based on 14 reviews. The website's critical consensus reads: "Condor never aspires to be a realistic depiction of spy games – instead, it excels at evoking a uniquely 21st century brand of paranoia with its slick concept and propulsive pacing." Metacritic, which uses a weighted average, assigned the series a score of 66 out of 100 based on 7 critics, indicating "generally favorable reviews."

In a positive review, IndieWires Ben Travers praised the series calling it "a Smartly Expanded Adaptation" and saying that it was "a solid spy story that updates the right elements without tarnishing old treasures."

References

External links 
 
 

2018 American television series debuts
2010s American drama television series
2020s American drama television series
English-language television shows
MGM+ original programming
Audience (TV network) original programming
Live action television shows based on films
Television series by MGM Television
Television series about the Central Intelligence Agency
Television shows filmed in Toronto
American spy thriller television series
Television series by Paramount Television
Television series by Skydance Television